Tirathaba is a genus of moths of the family Pyralidae described by Francis Walker in 1864.

Species
Tirathaba acyperella (Hampson in Ragonot, 1901)
Tirathaba albifusa (Hampson, 1917)
Tirathaba albilineata Whalley, 1964
Tirathaba aperta (Strand, 1920)
Tirathaba catharopa (Turner, 1937)
Tirathaba cissinobaphes (Turner, 1906)
Tirathaba citrinoides Whalley, 1964
Tirathaba complexa (Butler, 1885)
Tirathaba cyclophora (Hampson, 1917)
Tirathaba epichthonia Meyrick, 1937
Tirathaba expurgata Whalley, 1964
Tirathaba fuscistriata Hampson, 1917
Tirathaba grandinotella  Hampson, 1898
Tirathaba haematella Hampson in Ragonot, 1901
Tirathaba irrufatella Ragonot, 1901
Tirathaba leucostictalis (Lower, 1903)
Tirathaba leucotephras Meyrick, 1936
Tirathaba maculifera Hampson, 1917
Tirathaba monoleuca Lower, 1894
Tirathaba mundella Walker, 1864
Tirathaba nitidalis Hampson, 1917
Tirathaba pallida Whalley, 1964
Tirathaba parasiticus (T. P. Lucas, 1898)
Tirathaba pseudocomplana Hampson, 1917
Tirathaba psolopasta (Turner, 1913)
Tirathaba purpurella Hampson, 1917
Tirathaba rosella Hampson, 1898
Tirathaba rufivena (Walker, 1864)
Tirathaba ruptilinea (Walker, 1866)
Tirathaba unicolorella (Hampson, 1896)
Tirathaba xuthoptera (Turner, 1937)

Former species
Tirathaba acrocausta Meyrick 1897
Tirathaba distorta  Turner 1937
Tirathaba fructivora  Meyrick 1933
Tirathaba fuscolimbalis  Snellen 1900
Tirathaba hannoveri  Whalley 1964
Tirathaba hepialivora  Hampson 1901
Tirathaba trichogramma  Meyrick 1886

References

Tirathabini
Pyralidae genera